Crucis may refer to :

Astronomy
Alpha Crucis is the brightest star in constellation Crux.
Ampney Crucis is a village and civil parish in the Cotswolds.
Beta Crucis is the second brightest star in the constellation Crux.
Gamma Crucis is a red giant star in the constellation of Crux.
Lambda Crucis is a star in the constellation Crux.
Mu Crucis is the 7th brightest star in the constellation Crux,

Music
Crucis (band) was an Argentine band considered one of the pioneers of the Argentine progressive rock.

Religion
Ancient Mystical Order Rosæ Crucis a philosophical and humanist worldwide fraternal organization.
Ordo Crucis is a High Church Lutheran religious society for men.
Sign of the Cross (Signum Crucis), a ritual hand motion made by members of most but not all branches of Christianity. 
Theology of the Cross (Theologia Crucis), a term coined by the theologian Martin Luther to refer to theology which points to the cross as the only source of knowledge concerning who God is and how God saves.
Titulus Crucis is a relic kept in the church of Santa Croce in Gerusalemme in Rome.
Via Crucis refers to the depiction of the final hours of Jesus.

See also
Valle Crucis (disambiguation)